Ulf Hjalmar Ed Kristersson (born 29 December 1963) is a Swedish politician who has been serving as Prime Minister of Sweden since October 2022. He has been the leader of the Moderate Party (M) since October 2017 and a member of the Riksdag (MP) for Södermanland County since 2014 and for Stockholm County from 1991 to 2000. He previously served as Minister for Social Security from 2010 to 2014 and as Chairman of the Moderate Youth League from 1988 to 1992.

On 11 December 2014, he was appointed Shadow Finance Minister of the Moderate Party and economic policy spokesperson. On 1 October 2017 Kristersson was elected party leader of the Moderate Party after Anna Kinberg Batra stepped down. Under his leadership, M has opened up to the Sweden Democrats (SD) and, by late 2021, had formed an informal right-wing alliance with them and two centre-right parties of the dissolved Alliance. In the 2022 Swedish general election, that bloc obtained a majority in the Riksdag, leading to Kristersson's election as Prime Minister on 17 October.

Biography

Early life 
Ulf Kristersson was born in Lund, Skåne County, as the eldest of three children to Lars Kristersson (1938–2015) who worked with economics and teacher Karin Kristersson (née Axelsson; 1938–2020). The family moved to Torshälla outside Eskilstuna five years later. In his youth, Kristersson was a troupe gymnast.
Kristersson finished secondary school at S:t Eskils gymnasium in Eskilstuna. After graduating, Kristersson did military service as a platoon commander at Uppland Regiment from 1983 to 1984 and completed a degree in economics at Uppsala University.

Early political career 
In connection with the 1985 Swedish general election, he was employed as a campaigner at the Moderate Youth League (MUF) in Sörmland. On 26 November 1988, he rose to become the new Chairman of MUF, succeeding Beatrice Ask. In 1991, the centre-right Bildt Cabinet took power, and Kristersson became an MP. He served on the Social Security Committee. He soon becomes a vocal critic of the government's crisis agreement with Social Democrats. At the time, Kristersson developed a friendship with the former party leader, Gösta Bohman, who, in some respects, also supported his criticism of the Bildt Cabinet.

In 1992, Kristersson was challenged as chairman of MUF by Fredrik Reinfeldt. The congress was preceded by considerable ideological divisions between liberals and conservatives. All this erupted at the congress in Lycksele, which came to be known as the Battle of Lycksele. Kristersson, the liberal alternative, lost narrowly. It is said that his loss caused his withdrawal from front-line politics and he was subsequently known as part of the "Lost Generation" of the Moderate Party. At the time, he was criticized for his amateurism and preference for communication over political thought.

From 1995 to 1998, Kristersson was chief of marketing at Timbro, a free market think-tank, while also working in parliament. In 1994 he also released the book Non-working Generation at Timbros publishing company. In the book Kristersson argues against the welfare institutions in Sweden and compares these to apartheid because he considered these institutions to force people into passivity.

Career outside politics 
Kristersson left his parliamentary seat in April 2000, feeling that the new party leader Bo Lundgren had declined his services. Kristersson worked for two years in the private sector, mainly as communications director and VP for the internet consultancy Adcore, a dotcom crash casualty.

Kristersson was chairman of the Swedish Adoption Centre (Adoptionscenter). During his time as chairman, information emerged that the centre handled adoptions of children trafficked from China.

Municipal politics 
He returned to active politics in 2002 as Commissioner (Mayor) for Finance in Strängnäs and served there until 2006. In 2006, he was appointed Vice Mayor (Socialborgarråd) in Stockholm, responsible for the social welfare and labor division. During this time Kristersson got a rental contract for a five-room apartment in central Stockholm from Ersta Diakonisällskap. Ersta Diakonisällskap describes its basic purpose as "to be a support for people in vulnerable situations, to take social responsibility and to offer care.”
Due to that, Stockholm city was contracting and gave economical aid to Ersta Diakonisällskap, that, among other things provided for housing for those in social need. An investigation was started and Kristersson and another person in the associations leadership were suspected of bribery. According to an internal policy document, the apartments in the building were reserved for those newly employed by the association and students at Marie Cederschiöld högskola. The investigation was closed with the motivation that Kristersson did not have direct influence over the aid that the association could give. Fredrik Reinfeldt also asked Kristersson to lead the committee responsible for developing a new family policy for the party. He immediately caused controversy by suggesting that fathers must take a month of paternity leave for the family to receive all benefits. This was clearly conflicted with traditional Moderate Party policy, which has centred on individual choice.

Return to national politics 
On 5 October 2010, Fredrik Reinfeldt appointed Kristersson to become Minister of Social Security, a position he held for four years. After the 2014 Swedish general election, the Reinfeldt cabinet resigned, but Kristersson was elected as MP again, this time for Södermanland County. Following Reinfeldt's resignation as party leader, Anna Kinberg Batra appointed him as Shadow Finance Minister.

Leader of the Moderate Party 
Anna Kinberg Batra resigned as leader of the Moderates on 25 August 2017, after internal criticism. Kristersson publicly decided to run for leadership on 1 September and was elected on 1 October. The party saw a sharp increase in support in the polls, compared to the record low numbers under his predecessor Batra. He has a harsher stance against immigration than his predecessors.

2018–2019 government formation 

In September 2018, incumbent Prime Minister Stefan Löfven was ousted. Kristersson expressed hope of becoming the next Prime Minister. On 2 October, he was designated by Speaker of the Riksdag Andreas Norlén to form a new government. He initially sought to form a government coalition involving the Alliance parties (Moderate Party, Centre Party, Christian Democrats and Liberals) with support from the Swedish Social Democratic Party (S). On 9 October, he said that S had rejected all further talks on agreements and that he would now seek other ways to form a new government. On 14 October, he stated that he was not able to form a new government.

On 5 November 2018, Speaker Norlén proposed Kristersson as Prime Minister following breakdowns in all other government negotiations. On 14 November 2018, the Riksdag rejected Kristersson's bid to become Prime Minister by a vote of 195 to 154. It was the first time ever that a speaker's proposal for Prime Minister lost such a vote and the first time in 40 years that centre-right parties (Centre Party and Liberals) vetoed a centre-right candidate for Prime Minister.

2019–present 
Kristersson held a meeting in December 2019 with Jimmie Åkesson, leader of the Sweden Democrats, and said that he would cooperate with them in parliament. The anti-immigration party had previously been subject to a cordon sanitaire by all other parties, with Kristersson himself ruling out dialogue with them ahead of the 2018 elections. According to Ann-Cathrine Jungar of Södertörn University, this put Sweden in line with several other European countries in which centre-right and radical-right parties cooperate. In August 2020, he criticised the government for a perceived failure to deal with rising crime, including gun violence, which he called a "second pandemic".

2021 government crisis 

On 29 June 2021, after Prime Minister Stefan Löfven was ousted, Speaker of the Riksdag Andreas Norlén formally tasked Kristersson with forming a government. Kristersson had until 3 July to report his potential government to Norlén. Kristersson planned to lead a coalition of his own party along with the Christian Democrats, Liberals, and Sweden Democrats. On 1 July, Kristersson informed the Speaker that he did not have enough support to form a government and returned his mandate.

2022 government formation 

Kristersson led the Moderate Party (M) during the 2022 campaign, in which his party lost parliamentary seats, as well as the second place position (for the first time since the 1976 Swedish general election); nonetheless, the right-wing bloc gained an absolute majority, resulting in Magdalena Andersson's resignation and Kristersson's nomination as Prime Minister by Speaker Andreas Norlén. Kristersson signalled his preference for a coalition government between M, the Christian Democrats (KD) and Liberals (L) with external support from the Sweden Democrats (SD).

On 14 October, Kristersson presented the fully documented Tidö Agreement between M, KD, L and SD. This enabled the first three parties to seek a mandate for a new national administration to be chosen by the Riksdag, with SD given strong influence amounting to confidence and supply. On 17 October, Kristersson was elected Prime Minister by 176 Riksdag votes for, and 173 votes against him, with no absentees or abstentions. It is the first time SD has exerted direct government influence. European Union lawmakers criticized the center-right and M in particular, as a member of the European People's Party, for allying with the far right, as did opposition leaders.

The joint programme places particular emphasis on fighting crime, reducing immigration and reviving nuclear energy. The quota of refugees accepted each year would be drastically reduced from 6,400 to 900. The new authorities are also planning deportations for "bad behaviour". In terms of security policy, there is talk of authorizing searches in the absence of suspicious behaviour in certain neighbourhoods deemed sensitive, increasing the penalties and opening up the possibility of anonymous testimony in court. A national ban on begging will be tested. The agreement also provides for a downward revision of Sweden's greenhouse gas emission targets, a reduction in development aid and possible privatization.

With 19.1% of the vote for his party, Ulf Kristersson is the weakest prime minister since 1978. He began his term of office with a significantly lower popularity rating than that of the outgoing Prime Minister Magdalena Andersson.

Prime Minister of Sweden (2022–present) 

On 18 October 2022, Kristersson as per constitutional requirements was officially identified by the Swedish king as the new Prime Minister, having announced his program earlier that day in a speech to the Riksdag after which he had identified the members chosen for his cabinet.

On 27 October 2022, Kristersson and Ebba Busch announced a 55 billion (SEK) subsidy compensation in connection to the high increase of power bills; the subsidy will only be paid out in the energy price zones three and four in the southern parts of Sweden.

Foreign policy

Political positions and image 
A 2018 political profile in The Local described Kristersson as exuding "nice guy vibes: smart, humble and reasonable, easygoing and open to discussion" while positioning him to the right of his predecessors on issues such as crime and immigration. He was also described in the same profile as representing the neoliberal wing of the Moderate Party (M).

Kristersson himself has described social mobility as one of his core concerns in politics. In his first leadership speech, Kristersson stated that Sweden should become "a country for hopefuls" and that M should be "a party for hopefuls". On the matter of asylum, Kristersson states that he supports the integration of refugees into Swedish society but argues for compulsory cultural assimilation and learning of the Swedish language, and that refugees be put to work and pay tax.

Kristersson initially ruled out forming an alliance with the Sweden Democrats (SD) upon assuming party leadership; following the 2018 Swedish general election, he ended the policy of non-cooperation and met with SD's leadership for official talks. Before the 2022 Swedish general election, Kristersson suggested that he would form a loose right-wing bloc consisting of M, the Christian Democrats (KD), Liberals (L) and SD but expressed uncertainty at SD's demand that they be allocated cabinet positions should the right-wing bloc win a majority. Following the election, Kristersson signalled his ambition to form a new conservative government with support from SD.

Personal life 
Kristersson lives in Strängnäs. He is married since 1991 to Birgitta Ed (b. 1968), formerly a public relations consultant and as of 2023 a minister in the clergy of the Church of Sweden. They have three adopted three daughters from China. Kristersson is 169 centimeters (5' 6½") tall.

Controversy 
While he was responsible for social affairs in the Stockholm municipality from 2006 to 2010, the press revealed that he was occupying a flat normally intended for women victims of violence. An investigation into corruption is opened and then dropped.

References

External links 
 Ulf Kristersson (M)

|-

|-

|-

|-

|-

|-

|-

1963 births
20th-century Swedish politicians
21st-century Swedish politicians
Leaders of the Moderate Party
Living people
Members of the Riksdag 1991–1994
Members of the Riksdag 1994–1998
Members of the Riksdag 1998–2002
Members of the Riksdag 2014–2018
Members of the Riksdag 2018–2022
Members of the Riksdag 2022–2026
Members of the Riksdag from the Moderate Party
People from Lund
Prime Ministers of Sweden
Swedish Ministers for Social Security
Uppsala University alumni